The Smith–Appleby House Museum is a historic house museum in Smithfield, Rhode Island.  It is now home to the Smithfield Historical Society.

Description
Elisha Smith, a grandson of one of Rhode Island's co-founders, John Smith, "The Miller," built the original part of this house, a small stone-ender, in 1696.  The house was enlarged to a saltbox configuration c. 1713, adding chambers to the side and rear of the central chimney.  Around 1750 the roof was raised on the rear section, giving the house the full -story height it has today.  Between then and 1830 the house underwent a number of further alterations and enlargements, including the c. 1800 attachment of a second house (hauled from Johnston) that nearly doubled its living space.  The relocation of Stillwater Road in the 19th century as a consequence of the creation of Georgiaville Pond also resulted in a reconfiguration of the house, functionally reversing the front and rear.

The Smith–Appleby House Museum is open for tours during scheduled events, or tours may be arranged on request.

See also
List of the oldest buildings in Rhode Island
National Register of Historic Places listings in Providence County, Rhode Island

References

External links
Smith–Appleby House Museum - official site

Houses on the National Register of Historic Places in Rhode Island
Historic house museums in Rhode Island
Houses completed in 1696
Museums in Providence County, Rhode Island
Buildings and structures in Smithfield, Rhode Island
Houses in Providence County, Rhode Island
National Register of Historic Places in Providence County, Rhode Island
1696 establishments in Rhode Island
Blacksmith shops